Seattle Wireless was an American non-profit project created by Matt Westervelt and Ken Caruso in June 2000. It seeks to develop a free, locally owned wireless community network using  widely available, license-free technology wireless broadband Internet access. It is a metropolitan area network. As of 2016, Seattle Wireless is no longer operational.

Seattle Wireless is one of the first Community Wireless Networks and one of the first project focused wikis. It also had a short lived (7 episode) online television show, called Seattle Wireless TV.  It was created by Peter Yorke and Michael Pierce and ran July 2003 - June 2004. SWTV was an early adopter of Bittorrent to distribute its shows.

References

External links
Official website 
Matt's Blog 
Seattle Wireless Blog Planet
Peter Yorke's Blog
Kahney, Leander, "Home-grown Wireless Networks", TheFeature, 2001-05-07
Fleishman, Glenn, "The revolution may be wireless", Seattle Weekly, 2001-07-18
O'Shea, Dan, "Peace, Love & Wi-Fi", Telephony Online, 2002-05-18
Kharif, Olga, "Footing the Bill for Free Wi-Fi", BusinessWeek, 2002-09-17
"The Insider: Lucky few are going locomotive over Wi-Fi access", Seattle PI, 2005-03-28

Wireless network organizations